Kyzyl-Bulak is a village in Batken Region of Kyrgyzstan. It is part of the Kadamjay District. Its population was 2,272 in 2021.

Nearby towns and villages include Orozbekov and Kadamjay.

References

Populated places in Batken Region